This article shows the squads of all participating teams at the men's field hockey tournament at the 2020 Summer Olympics in Tokyo.

In July 2021, the IOC allowed teams to nominate up to 18 players instead of the usual 16, due to the COVID-19 pandemic.

Age, caps and club as of 24 July 2021.

Group A

Argentina

The squad was announced on 14 June 2021.

Head coach: Mariano Ronconi

Reserve:
Emiliano Bosso

Australia

The squad was announced on 14 June 2021.

Head coach: Colin Batch

Reserve:
Tyler Lovell

India

The squad was announced on 18 June 2021.

Head coach: Graham Reid

Japan

The squad was announced on 8 June 2021.

Head coach:  Siegfried Aikman

Reserve:
Yusuke Tanako (GK)

New Zealand

The squad was announced on 10 June 2021.

Head coach: Darren Smith

Spain

The squad was announced on 5 July 2021. On 9 July, Joan Tarrés withdrew injured and was replaced by Llorenç Piera.

Head coach:  Fred Soyez

Reserve:
Mario Garín

Group B

Belgium

The squad was announced on 24 June 2021.

Head coach:  Shane McLeod

Reserve:
Loic Van Doren

Canada

Canada's team roster of 16 athletes was named on June 28, 2021. Before the expansion of each roster, the alternates were Taylor Curran and Brandon Pereira.

Head coach:   Pasha Gademan

Reserve:
David Vandenbossche

Germany

The squad was announced on 28 May 2021.

Head coach: Kais al Saadi

Reserve:
Victor Aly

Great Britain

The squad was announced on 17 June 2021.

Head coach: Danny Kerry

Netherlands

The squad was announced on 28 May 2021.

Head coach:  Maximiliano Caldas

Reserve:
Maurits Visser

South Africa

The squad was announced on 27 May 2021.

Head coach: Gareth Ewing

Reserve:
Siya Nolutshungu

References

2020
squads
Field hockey Men's